The Ducati Deluxe is a  single cylinder bevel drive SOHC motorcycle produced by the Spanish manufacturer MotoTrans, who were licensed by Ducati to produce motorcycles under the Ducati brand name. The model was based on the 'narrow case' Ducati Diana 250 and produced from 1963 to 1973. The Deluxe was, in terms of production numbers, MotoTrans' most successful model.

History
In post-Civil War Spain, the Franco regime banned the import of motorcycles and also forbade foreign nationals from settling in Spain, or stating a business there. MotoTrans was set up to manufacture Ducati motorcycles under licence in Barcelona in 1957.

Bultaco and Montesa had both introduced their second generation two strokes, which had better performance than the Spanish Ducatis. This prompted MotoTrans to produce a 250 based on the Italian Diana.

There were minor changes during the production life such as handlebars and mudguards. The machines were finished in blue and metallic silver, except for a few machines that were exported to the UK and finished in Black and silver. A five speed gearbox was fitted from late 1970.

A version of the Deluxe was used by the Guàrdia Urbana de Barcelona and other police forces.

In 1973, the final year of production, the model was updated using the  engine from the 24 Horas/Road, the wider wheels of the Road and the seat, instruments and headlight of the 24 Horas. The 73 model was finished in cherry red and old gold.

Technical details

Engine and transmission
The single cylinder bevel drive OHC engine was of unit construction and had an alloy head and alloy barrel with cast iron liners. An 8:1 piston was fitted.

Fuel was delivered by either a 24 mm Dell'Orto UB or a Spanish made Amal Monobloc 376/25 carburettor. The engine used wet sump lubrication and ignition was by battery and coil.

Primary drive was by gears to a multi-plate wet clutch and 4 speed gearbox. Chain drive took power to the rear wheel. A 5 speed gearbox was fitted from 1970.

Cycle parts
The single cradle frame used the engine as a stressed member. Rear suspension was by swinging arm with twin adjustable shock absorbers. At the front telescopic forks were fitted. Brakes were drums, the front being  diameter and the rear .

References

Bibliography

External links

 
 

Deluxe
Standard motorcycles
Motorcycles introduced in 1963
Single-cylinder motorcycles